Mikael Pernfors and Tobias Svantesson won in the final against Agustín Moreno and Jaime Yzaga.

Seeds
Champion seeds are indicated in bold text while text in italics indicates the round in which those seeds were eliminated.

  David Pate /  Tim Wilkison (semifinals)
  Paul Annacone /  Johan Kriek (semifinals)
  Brad Gilbert /  Robert Seguso (first round)
  Dan Goldie /  Greg Van Emburgh (first round)

Draw

References

1989 U.S. Men's Clay Court Championships